Moon is a given name. Notable people with the name include:

 Moon Bloodgood, actress and model
 Moon Landrieu, politician and former Mayor of New Orleans
 Moon Martin, singer and songwriter
 Moon Moon Sen, Indian actress
 Moon Zappa, actress and writer
 Moon Wen, destination 
 Moon, supporting character in Star vs. the Forces of Evil and is Queen of the planet Mewni